The 2022 Asian Beach Handball Championship was be 8th edition of the championship held from 22 to 28 March 2022 at Tehran, Iran under the aegis of Asian Handball Federation (AHF). It was the second time in history that the championship was organised by IR Iran Handball Federation. It also acted as a qualification tournament for the 2022 Beach Handball World Championships, with the top two teams in each gender from the championship directly qualifying for the event to be hosted by Greece.

Venue 
The event took place at the Iran Sports Complex in Tehran.

Results

References

External links

International handball competitions hosted by Iran
Handball competitions in Asia
Asia
Asian Handball Championships
Asian Beach Handball Championship
Asian Beach Handball Championship
Asian Beach Handball
Handball competitions in Iran
 Beach handball competitions